Lullingstone railway station is an unopened station on the Maidstone line which was constructed to serve a proposed airport and expected residential development at Lullingstone near Eynsford in Kent. The station was never brought into use as World War II and subsequent post-war planning legislation put an end to the plans for the area. Largely demolished in 1955, the remains of the station are visible to the south of the Eynsford Tunnel.

History
During the 1920s and 1930s, London's suburbs expanded rapidly, leading to a period of unprecedented housebuilding. As new sites for development were sought out, so the Kemp Town Brewery Co. purchased a 5,000-acre estate near the rural community of Lullingstone in Kent. At the same time, the British government had been studying the future of air transport and airports in the London area and had decided that London would be served by four airports: the existing sites at Croydon and Heston, together with new airports at Fairlop and Lullingstone.

In August 1936, it was reported in the Kentish Times that the Southern Railway were proposing to establish an aerodrome at Lullingstone which would be used by Imperial Airways. Although the proposal was abandoned by the Southern Railway, it was taken up by the Air Ministry which saw Lullingstone as the most suitable site for a fourth airport to serve the London metropolis. In March 1938, the Southern Railway announced its intention not to proceed with the airport.

Plans had been drawn up by the Southern Railway for a substantial four-platform station situated immediately to the south of the  Eynsford Tunnel. Two platforms would serve the main line, with two others on a new branch line curving away to the west to reach the proposed airport. A footbridge would span the four platforms and also lead to a booking office and passenger facilities located above the platforms. The official opening date of the station was scheduled for 2 April 1939.

By early 1939, the main line platforms and their ferro-concrete station buildings had been completed as well as steps leading up to a footbridge which would span the platforms. The local authority, Dartford Rural District Council, objected to the name of the station because it was not in Lullingstone parish.  Further work ceased upon the outbreak of World War II, although the station was shown, unserved, in public timetables. It was shown in Bradshaw's Guide between July 1939 and June 1941 as served by trains, but with a note that the opening date would be announced. From January 1942, the trains and note were removed but the station was still shown.

As a result of the war and the failure of the airport to materialise, Lullingstone station was never brought into use and gradually became derelict. The introduction of the post-war Green Belt Act put a halt to any potential residential development and the incomplete station, standing in the middle of fields, was useless. It was mostly dismantled in 1955, leaving only the concrete supports for the platforms.

 substantial remains of the platforms and the abandoned concrete approach road remain.

References

Notes

Sources

Further reading

Buildings and structures in Sevenoaks District
Disused railway stations in Kent
Former Southern Railway (UK) stations
Unbuilt railway stations in the United Kingdom